Hayden Creek is a stream in the U.S. state of Idaho. It is a tributary to the Lemhi River.

Hayden Creek has the name of Jim Hayden, a pioneer citizen.

References

Rivers of Idaho
Rivers of Lemhi County, Idaho